A hall, wall, or walk of fame is a list of individuals, achievements, or other entities, usually chosen by a group of electors, to mark their excellence or fame in their field. In some cases, these halls of fame consist of actual halls or museums that enshrine the honorees with sculptures, plaques, and displays of memorabilia and general information regarding the inducted recipients. Sometimes, the honorees' plaques may instead be posted on a wall (hence a "wall of fame") or inscribed on a sidewalk (as in a "walk of fame", "walk of stars", or "avenue of fame"). In other cases, the hall of fame is more figurative and consists of a list of names of noteworthy people and their achievements and contributions. The lists are maintained by an organization or community, and may be national, state, local, or private.

Etymology 
The term "hall of fame" first appeared in German with the Ruhmeshalle, built in 1853 in Munich. The Walhalla memorial in Bavaria was conceived in 1807 and built between 1830 and 1842. Inspired by the Ruhmeshalle, the English-language term was popularised in the United States by the Hall of Fame for Great Americans, a sculpture gallery completed in 1900 and officially dedicated in 1901. Located in the Bronx in New York City, it is on the campus of Bronx Community College (until 1973 the University Heights campus of New York University).

The meaning of "fame" has changed over the years, originally meaning "renown" for achievement, as opposed to today's more common meaning of "celebrity".

Halls of fame

Automotive 
 Automotive Hall of Fame
 Model Car Hall of Fame

Aviation and space 

 Arizona Aviation Hall of Fame
 United States Astronaut Hall of Fame
 Aviation Hall of Fame and Museum of New Jersey
 Canada's Aviation Hall of Fame
 Colorado Aviation Hall of Fame
 Georgia Aviation Hall of Fame
 International Space Hall of Fame
 Iowa Aviation Hall of Fame
 Minnesota Aviation Hall of Fame
 National Aviation Hall of Fame
 Naval Aviation Hall of Honor
 Space Camp Hall of Fame
 Texas Aviation Hall of Fame
 US Space Walk of Fame
 Utah Aviation Hall of Fame
 Women in Aviation International Pioneer Hall of Fame

Arts

Music 

 Alabama Jazz Hall of Fame
 Alabama Music Hall of Fame
 American Classical Music Hall of Fame and Museum
 The Apollo Theatre Hall of Fame (New York City)
 Australian Recording Industry Hall of Fame
 Beatová síň slávy
 Billboard Latin Music Hall of Fame
 Blues Hall of Fame
 Canadian Music Hall of Fame
 Country Music Hall of Fame
 Dance Music Hall of Fame
 Down Beat Jazz Hall of Fame
 Georgia Music Hall of Fame
 Gospel Music Hall of Fame
 Grammy Hall of Fame (for recordings)
 Grammy Lifetime Achievement Award (for people)
 Hawaiian Music Hall of Fame
 Hip Hop Hall of Fame
 Hit Parade Hall of Fame
 Hollywood's Rockwalk
 International Bluegrass Music Hall of Fame
 International Latin Music Hall of Fame
 Latin Grammy Hall of Fame (for recordings)
 Latin Songwriters Hall of Fame
 Long Island Music Hall of Fame
 Louisiana Music Hall of Fame
 Memphis Music Hall of Fame
 Mississippi Musicians Hall of Fame
 Musicians Hall of Fame and Museum
 Nashville Songwriters Hall of Fame
 New Zealand Music Hall of Fame
 Oklahoma Music Hall of Fame
 Polka Hall of Fame
 Rhode Island Music Hall of Fame
 Rhythm and Blues Music Hall of Fame
 Rockabilly Hall of Fame
 Rock and Roll Hall of Fame
 Songwriters Hall of Fame
 Southern Gospel Museum and Hall of Fame
 Steel Guitar Hall of Fame
 Texas Country Music Hall of Fame
 UK Music Hall of Fame
 Vocal Group Hall of Fame
 West Virginia Music Hall of Fame
 Edmund Allan Brown Hall of Fame

Show business, media, and theater 

 American Theater Hall of Fame
 American TV Game Show Hall of Fame
 AVN Hall of Fame ([[AVN Magazine|Adult Video News]])
 BC Entertainment Hall of Fame
 Black Filmmakers Hall of Fame
 Crypto Hall of Fame
 Mascot Hall of Fame
 National Radio Hall of Fame
 Television Hall of Fame
 Texas Film Hall of Fame
 World Video Game Hall of Fame

Writing

At least 13 writers' halls of fame exist in the United States alone, or at least 10 besides three songwriters' ones listed above in "Music" section.  These provide recognition of life-time bodies of work by authors, whether living or dead, as opposed to being awards for individual works.

 Sports and games 

 Multiple sports 

 Aboriginal and Islander Sports Hall of Fame
 Alberta Sports Hall of Fame
 Canada's Sports Hall of Fame
 Germany's Sports Hall of Fame
 International Jewish Sports Hall of Fame
 National Italian American Sports Hall of Fame
 National Jewish Sports Hall of Fame and Museum
 National Polish-American Sports Hall of Fame
 Oregon Sports Hall of Fame
 Philadelphia Sports Hall of Fame
 State of Washington Sports Hall of Fame
 Staten Island Sports Hall of Fame
 Sports Hall of Fame Suriname
 United States Olympic & Paralympic Hall of Fame
 Virginia Sports Hall of Fame and Museum
 Walk of Fame of Italian sport

 College sports 

 Cricket 
 Australian Cricket Hall of Fame
 ICC Cricket Hall of Fame

 Association football 

 A.S. Roma Hall of Fame
 ACF Fiorentina Hall of Fame
 Asian Football Hall of Fame
 Brazilian Football Museum Hall of Fame
 Brentford F.C. Hall of Fame
 Canada Soccer Hall of Fame
 D.C. United Hall of Tradition
 English Football Hall of Fame
 Football Federation Australia Hall of Fame
 German Football Hall of Fame
 Gwladys Street's Hall of Fame
 Inter Milan Hall of Fame
 Ipswich Town F.C. Hall of Fame
 Israeli Football Hall of Fame
 Italian Football Hall of Fame
 Norwich City F.C. Hall of Fame
 Premier League Hall of Fame
 Scottish Football Hall of Fame
 Torino F.C. Hall of Fame
 U.S. Soccer Hall of Fame

 Australian rules football (AFL) 
 Australian Football Hall of Fame (Est. 1996)
 South Australian Football Hall of Fame (Est. 2002)
 Tasmanian Football Hall of Fame (Est. 2005)
 West Australian Football Hall of Fame (Est. 2004)

 Baseball and softball 

 Canadian Baseball Hall of Fame
 Caribbean Baseball Hall of Fame
 Cuban Baseball Hall of Fame
 Japanese Baseball Hall of Fame
 Mexican Baseball Hall of Fame
 Venezuelan Baseball Hall of Fame and Museum
 National Baseball Hall of Fame and Museum (U.S.)
 National College Baseball Hall of Fame (U.S.)
 Angels Hall of Fame
 Astros Hall of Fame
 Athletics Hall of Fame
 Atlanta Braves Museum and Hall of Fame
 Baltimore Orioles Hall of Fame
 Boston Red Sox Hall of Fame
 Chicago Cubs Hall of Fame
 Cincinnati Reds Hall of Fame and Museum
 Cleveland Guardians Hall of Fame
 Kansas City Royals Hall of Fame
 Miller Park Walk of Fame
 Milwaukee Brewers Wall of Honor
 Minnesota Twins Hall of Fame
 New York Mets Hall of Fame
 New York Yankees Monument Park
 Philadelphia Baseball Wall of Fame
 Pittsburgh Pirates Hall of Fame
 St. Louis Cardinals Hall of Fame Museum
 San Diego Padres Hall of Fame
 San Francisco Giants Wall of Fame
 Seattle Mariners Hall of Fame
 Texas Rangers Hall of Fame
 National Softball Hall of Fame (U.S.)

 Basketball 

 Australian Basketball Hall of Fame (formerly NBL Hall of Fame)
 EuroLeague Hall of Fame
 FIBA Hall of Fame
 Finnish Basketball Hall of Fame
 French Basketball Hall of Fame
 Greek Basket League Hall of Fame
 Indiana Basketball Hall of Fame (U.S.)
 Italian Basketball Hall of Fame
 Naismith Memorial Basketball Hall of Fame (U.S.)
 National Collegiate Basketball Hall of Fame (U.S.)
 PBA Hall of Fame
 VTB United League Hall of Fame
 Women's Basketball Hall of Fame

 Boxing 
 Australian National Boxing Hall of Fame
 International Boxing Hall of Fame
 Minnesota Boxing Hall of Fame
 Nevada Boxing Hall of Fame
 Ring 8 and New York State Boxing Hall of Fame

 Equestrian 

 American Quarter Horse Hall of Fame
 Michigan Quarter Horse Association Hall of Fame
 National Reined Cow Horse Association Hall of Fame
 National Reining Horse Association Hall of Fame
 National Snaffle Bit Association Hall of Fame
 NCHA Horse Hall of Fame
 NCHA Members Hall of Fame
 NCHA Rider Hall of Fame
 The British Horse Society Equestrian Hall of Fame

 Golf 
 Michigan Golf Hall of Fame
 Tennessee Golf Hall of Fame
 Wisconsin Golf Hall of Fame
 World Golf Hall of Fame

 Gridiron football 

 Arena Football Hall of Fame
 Canadian Football Hall of Fame
 College Football Hall of Fame
 Pro Football Hall of Fame

 Horse racing 

 Aiken Thoroughbred Racing Hall of Fame and Museum
 Australian Racing Hall of Fame
 British Horseracing Hall of Fame
 British Steeplechasing Hall of Fame
 Calder Race Course Hall of Fame
 Canadian Horse Racing Hall of Fame
 Fair Grounds Racing Hall of Fame
 Harness Racing Museum & Hall of Fame
 Inter Dominion Hall of Fame
 Japan Racing Association Hall of Fame
 Korea Racing Authority Equine Museum
 National Museum of Racing and Hall of Fame
 New Zealand Racing Hall of Fame
 New Zealand Trotting Hall of Fame

 Ice hockey 

 Finnish Hockey Hall of Fame
 Hockey Hall of Fame
 IIHF Hall of Fame
 Original Hockey Hall of Fame
 United States Hockey Hall of Fame
 Wisconsin Hockey Hall of Fame

 Lacrosse 
 Canadian Lacrosse Hall of Fame
 Lacrosse Museum and National Hall of Fame
 National Lacrosse League Hall of Fame (indoor lacrosse; North America)

 Martial arts 
 Australasian Martial Arts Hall of Fame
 World Tae Kwon Do Federation Hall of Fame
 UFC Hall of Fame

 Motorsports 

 Canadian Motorsport Hall of Fame
 FIA Hall of Fame
 MotoGP Hall of Fame
 Indianapolis Motor Speedway Hall of Fame Museum
 International Motorsports Hall of Fame
 Motorcycle Hall of Fame
 Motorsports Hall of Fame of America
 NASCAR Hall of Fame
 National Dirt Late Model Hall of Fame
 National Midget Auto Racing Hall of Fame
 National Sprint Car Hall of Fame
 Off-Road Motorsports Hall of Fame
 SCCA Hall of Fame
 Supercars Hall of Fame

 Professional wrestling 

 CZW Hall of Fame
 Hardcore Hall of Fame
 Impact Hall of Fame
 New England Pro Wrestling Hall of Fame
 NWA Hall of Fame
 NWA Wrestling Legends Hall of Heroes
 Professional Wrestling Hall of Fame
 ROH Hall of Fame
 St. Louis Wrestling Hall of Fame
 WCW Hall of Fame
 WWE Hall of Fame

 Rugby league 

 Bulldogs Hall of Fame (est. 2007)
 Rugby Football League Hall of Fame (est. 1988)
 Rugby League Hall of Fame (est. 1988)
 Australian Rugby League Hall of Fame (est. 2002)
 Widnes Vikings Hall of Fame (est. 1992)
 Wigan Warriors Hall of Fame (est. 1998)

 Rugby union 
 International Rugby Hall of Fame – no longer exists as a separate entity; merged into the World Rugby Hall in 2014
 World Rugby Hall of Fame
 US Rugby Hall of Fame

 Tennis 
 Australian Tennis Hall of Fame
 International Tennis Hall of Fame

 Water polo 
 Water Polo Australia Hall of Fame
 USA Water Polo Hall of Fame

 Winter sports 

 Canadian Curling Hall of Fame
 Canadian Ski Hall of Fame
 United States Figure Skating Hall of Fame
 United States National Ski Hall of Fame and Museum
 World Curling Federation Hall of Fame
 World Figure Skating Hall of Fame

 Board and card games 
 ACBL Hall of Fame (bridge)
 World Chess Hall of Fame
 Poker Hall of Fame

 Other sports 

 America's Cup Hall of Fame (sailing)
 Billiard Congress of America Hall of Fame
 Disc Golf Hall of Fame
 International Bowling Hall of Fame
 International Gymnastics Hall of Fame
 International Swimming Hall of Fame (diving, swimming, synchronized swimming, water polo)
 ITTF Hall of Fame (table tennis)
 Mountain Bike Hall of Fame
 National Distance Running Hall of Fame
 National Sailing Hall of Fame
 National Wrestling Hall of Fame
 New Zealand Coaches Hall of Fame
 Roller Derby Hall of Fame
 United States Bicycling Hall of Fame
 United States Bowling Congress Hall of Fame
 USA Field Hockey Hall of Fame
 USA Ultimate Hall of Fame
 Volleyball Hall of Fame

 Cowboy and rodeo 

 Australian Stockman's Hall of Fame
 Bull Riding Hall of Fame
 California Rodeo Salinas Hall of Fame
 Canadian Pro Rodeo Hall of Fame
 Cheyenne Frontier Days Old West Museum
 Ellensburg Rodeo Hall of Fame
 Hall of Great Western Performers
 Hall of Great Westerners
 Idaho Rodeo Hall of Fame
 Indian National Finals Rodeo Hall of Fame
 Kansas Cowboy Hall of Fame
 Montana Cowboy Hall of Fame
 National Cowboy & Western Heritage Museum
 National Cowgirl Museum and Hall of Fame
 National Multicultural Western Heritage Museum
 North Dakota Cowboy Hall of Fame
 Oahu Cattlemen's Association Paniolo Hall of Fame
 Pendleton Round-Up and Happy Canyon Hall of Fame
 Professional Bull Riders: Heroes and Legends
 ProRodeo Hall of Fame
 Rex Allen Arizona Cowboy Museum and Willcox Cowboy Hall of Fame
 Rodeo Hall of Fame
 St. Paul Rodeo Hall of Fame
 Texas Cowboy Hall of Fame
 Texas Rodeo Cowboy Hall of Fame
 Texas Rodeo Hall of Fame
 Texas Trail of Fame
 Utah Cowboy and Western Heritage Museum
 Western Heritage Museum & Lea County Cowboy Hall of Fame
 Wyoming Cowboy Hall of Fame

 Miscellaneous 

 AIAS Hall of Fame
 ARIA Hall of Fame
 Alabama Hall of Fame
 American National Business Hall of Fame
 Asian Hall Of Fame
 Australian Television Logie Hall of Fame
 Burlesque Hall of Fame
 California Hall of Fame
 Caddie Hall of Fame
 California Social Work Hall of Distinction
 Canadian Agricultural Hall of Fame
 Canadian Business Hall of Fame
 Canadian Cartoonist Hall of Fame
 Canadian Medical Hall of Fame
 Canadian News Hall of Fame
 Canadian Science and Engineering Hall of Fame
 Candy Hall of Fame
 Circus Hall of Fame
 Consumer Electronics Hall of Fame
 Film Hall of Fame (Online Film & Television Association) 
 Hall of Fame for Great Americans - the first "hall of fame"
 Hall of Flame Fire Museum (thus spelled)
 Insurance Hall of Fame
 International Scuba Diving Hall of Fame
 International Space Hall of Fame
 Internet Hall of Fame
 Lordsburg Hidalgo County Museum
 Magic: The Gathering Hall of Fame
 Military Intelligence Hall of Fame
 NAB Broadcasting Hall of Fame
 National Agricultural Center and Hall of Fame
 National Inventors Hall of Fame
 National LGBTQ Wall of Honor
 National Mining Hall of Fame
 National Museum of Dance and Hall of Fame
 National Radio Hall of Fame
 National Toy Hall of Fame
 National Women's Hall of Fame
 Nebraska Hall of Fame
 New Jersey Hall of Fame
 New York State Writers Hall of Fame
 North America Railway Hall of Fame
 Queensland Business Leaders Hall of Fame
 Rainbow Honor Walk
 Robot Hall of Fame
 Science Fiction Museum and Hall of Fame
 Scottish Engineering Hall of Fame
 Sporting Goods Industry Hall of Fame
 South Dakota Hall of Fame
 Texas Ranger Hall of Fame and Museum
 Texas Women's Hall of Fame
 Toy Industry Hall of Fame
 U.S. Business Hall of Fame
 Walhalla memorial
 Wallace Monument Hall of Heroes''
 Wembley Arena Square of Fame
 Will Eisner Award Hall of Fame
 Western Music Association Hall of Fame

Walls of fame 
 Piteå Wall of Fame
 Liverpool Wall of Fame
 Buffalo Bills Wall of Fame
 Missouri Wall of Fame
 Philadelphia Baseball Wall of Fame
 San Francisco Giants Wall of Fame

Walks of fame 

 Aerospace Walk of Honor (Lancaster, California, U.S.)
 Almeria Walk of Fame (Almeria, Spain)
 America's Walk of Honor (Valley Forge, Pennsylvania, U.S.)
 Anaheim Walk of Stars (Anaheim, California, U.S.)
 Australian of the Year Walk (Canberra, ACT, Australia)
 Australian Film Walk of Fame (Randwick, Sydney, Australia)
 Birmingham Walk of Stars (Birmingham, England, U.K.) 
 Black Music & Entertainment Walk of Fame (Atlanta, Georgia, U.S.)
 Boulevard der Stars (de) (Berlin, Germany)
 Bronx Walk of Fame (New York City, U.S.)
 Canada's Walk of Fame (Toronto, Ontario, Canada)
 Dog Walk of Fame (London, England, U.K.)
 Entrepreneur Walk of Fame (Cambridge, Massachusetts, U.S.)
 Eastwood City Walk of Fame (Quezon City, Philippines)
 GMA Network's Walk of Fame (Quezon City, Philippines)
 Gennett Walk of Fame (Richmond, Indiana, U.S.)
 Hollywood Walk of Fame (Los Angeles, California, U.S.)
 Hong Kong Avenue of Stars (Hong Kong)
 International Civil Rights Walk of Fame (Atlanta, Georgia, U.S.)
 Italian Walk of Fame (Toronto, Ontario, Canada)
 Jubilee 150 Walkway (Adelaide, South Australia, Australia)
 Kazan Alley of Tatar Stars (Kazan, Tatarstan, Russia)
 Las Vegas Walk of Stars (Las Vegas, Nevada, U.S.)
 Łódź Walk of Fame (film) (pl) (Piotrkowska Street, Łódź, Poland)
 London Avenue of Stars (London, England, U.K.)
 Long Beach Motorsports Walk of Fame (Long Beach, California, U.S)
 Michigan Walk of Fame (Lansing, Michigan, U.S.)
 Milwaukee Brewers Walk of Fame (Milwaukee, Wisconsin, U.S.)
 New Rochelle Walk of Fame (New Rochelle, New York, U.S.)
 Munich Olympic Walk of Stars (Munich, Bavaria, Germany)
 Music City Walk of Fame (Nashville, Tennessee, U.S.)
 Palm Springs Walk of Stars (Palm Springs, California, U.S.)
 Paseo de las Luminarias, Mexico City
 Rainbow Honor Walk, San Francisco, California
 Sault Ste Marie Walk of Fame (Sault Ste. Marie, Ontario, Canada)
 Sheffield Legends (Sheffield, England, U.K.)
 St. Louis Walk of Fame (St. Louis, Missouri, U.S.)
 US Space Walk of Fame (Titusville, Florida, U.S.)
 Walk of Fame (Brighton, England, U.K.)
 Walk of Fame Bucharest (Bucharest, Romania)
 Walk of Game (San Francisco, California, U.S.)
 Walk of the Stars (Mumbai, Maharashtra, India)
 Walk of Western Stars (Santa Clarita, California, U.S.)

See also 

 Hall of Honor

References

External links 
 
 

 
Halls
Halls